Maleike Geraldine Pacheco Álvarez (born 20 October 1993) is a Venezuelan footballer who plays as a defender for Ecuadorian club Barcelona SC and the Venezuela women's national team.

International career
Pacheco represented Venezuela at the 2010 FIFA U-17 Women's World Cup. At senior level, she played the 2014 Copa América Femenina and the 2014 Central American and Caribbean Games. She was also a part of the roster for the 2018 Copa América Femenina, but did not play.

References

External links

1993 births
Living people
Women's association football goalkeepers
Venezuelan women's footballers
Footballers from Caracas
Venezuela women's international footballers
Competitors at the 2014 Central American and Caribbean Games
Cortuluá footballers
Barcelona S.C. footballers
Venezuelan expatriate women's footballers
Venezuelan expatriate sportspeople in Ecuador
Expatriate women's footballers in Ecuador
Venezuelan expatriate sportspeople in Trinidad and Tobago
Expatriate footballers in Trinidad and Tobago
Venezuelan expatriate sportspeople in Colombia
Expatriate women's footballers in Colombia